Calmodulin-regulated spectrin-associated protein 1 (CAMSAP1) is a human protein encoded by the gene CAMSAP1. Like other CAMSAP-family proteins, it is a microtubule minus-end anchor, and binds microtubules through its CKK domain.

Clinical significance 
CAMSAP1 is vital for neuron polarisation, and so mice that lack CAMSAP1 die of epileptic seizures.

See also 

 CAMSAP2
 CAMSAP3

References